USS Paducah (PG-18) was a  acquired by the US Navy prior to World War I. Her task was to patrol, escort, and protect Navy ships.

Construction
Paducah (Gunboat No. 18/PG-18) was launched 11 October 1904, by Gas Engine and Power Co. and Charles L. Seabury Co., Morris Heights, New York; sponsored by Miss Anna May Yeiser; and commissioned 2 September 1905. She was reclassified AG–7 in 1919; IX–23, 24 April 1922; and PG–18, 4 November 1940.

Service history 
After shakedown, Paducah joined the Caribbean Squadron early in 1906 to protect American lives and interests through patrols and port calls to Caribbean and Central American and South American cities. She patrolled Mexican waters in the aftermath of the Vera Cruz incident through the summer of 1914, then returned to her Caribbean operations, performing surveys from time to time.

Paducah was ordered north to prepare at Portsmouth, New Hampshire, for European service in World War I, for which she sailed from New York 29 September 1917. She reached Gibraltar 27 October, and based there as convoy escort to North Africa, Italy, the Azores, and Madeira. She attacked a U-boat 9 September 1918 after it had sunk one of her convoy, and was credited with possibly damaging the submarine. Leaving Gibraltar 11 December, Paducah reached Portsmouth, New Hampshire, 7 January 1919 to decommission 2 March 1919.

She again recommissioned 16 August 1920 through 9 September 1921 for survey duty in the Caribbean. Paducah was commissioned a third time 2 May 1922 for duty training Naval Reservists in the 9th Naval District. She arrived Duluth, Minnesota, 20 June, replacing the USS Essex which then became a receiving ship.  These training missions included regular two-week cruises, and gunnery practice on Lake Michigan.  In addition to regular duties, the ship was used for miscellaneous ceremonial purposes, assisted in the fight against a fire on Isle Royale, and assisted with rescue work when the Mississippi River flooded.

Paducah was modified in the early 1930s to run on oil-fired boilers.  The triple expansion engines were installed, with boilers fore and aft.  Additional modifications included hammock berthing on a new boat deck, and a sheltered main deck between the quarterdeck and the pilot house.

Paducah returned to the U.S. East Coast in early 1941, and through World War II, trained Naval Armed Guard gunners in Chesapeake Bay, thus giving vital service to the Merchant Marine's crucial World War II assignment.

Post US Navy service
Decommissioning 7 September 1945, Paducah transferred to the Maritime Commission 19 December 1946, and was sold the same day to Maria Angelo, Miami, Florida. After she was sold in Miami, the ship was obtained by the Israeli group Haganah and renamed Geula, meaning "Redemption". A volunteer American crew sailed her to Bayonne, France, and from there to Bulgaria.  Geula embarked 1,388 Jewish refugees and, led by former Spanish Republican Navy commander Miguel Buiza, the ship tried to run the British blockade and bring the refugees to Palestine.

She was intercepted on 2 October 1947 and brought to Haifa, where she was left with other captured "illegal" immigrant ships. Because she was a former naval vessel the newly formed Israeli Navy examined her in 1948 for possible service, but she was not in good shape and was not accepted for service. She was refurbished sufficiently to sail as an Israeli merchant vessel and made one trip in late 1948 from Haifa to Naples, Italy. There she was tied up and eventually sold for scrap in 1951.

Commanders

Awards
Cuban Pacification Medal
Mexican Service Medal
World War I Victory Medal
American Defense Service Medal
American Campaign Medal
World War II Victory Medal

References

External links 
 USS Paducah
 NavSource Online: Gunboat Photo Archive - Paducah (PG 18) - ex-IX-23 - ex-AG-7 - ex-Gunboat No. 18

 

Dubuque-class gunboats
Ships built in Morris Heights, Bronx
1904 ships
World War I patrol vessels of the United States
World War II patrol vessels of the United States
Jewish immigrant ships